The Canadian Curling Club Championships (branded as the Everest Curling Club Championships for sponsorship reasons) is an annual curling tournament held in Canada. The tournament features the top "club level" curlers from every province and territory in Canada, plus Northern Ontario.

The first event was held in 2009. Each province and territory holds a series of playdowns where only one team per curling club is allowed an entry. Each curling club selects their teams independently with many choosing their respective club champions.

The event features only "club level" curlers. This means that top curling teams are barred from entry. Teams can only have one player who has played in a provincial men's, women's or seniors event that season or the previous season or in a Grand Slam of Curling event that year or in the previous year.

Champions

References

External links